The Syndicate: A Death in the Family (also known as Red Hot Shot) is a 1970 Italian crime film directed by Piero Zuffi and written by Ennio Flaiano and the same Zuffi.

In 2004 it was restored and shown as part of the retrospective "Storia Segreta del Cinema Italiano: Italian Kings of the Bs" at the 61st Venice International Film Festival.

Cast
 Michael Reardon as Frank Berin
 Barbara Bouchet as Monica Brown
 Carmelo Bene as Billy Desco
 Susanna Martinkova as Fanny, La Cieca
 Isa Miranda as Tenutaria del Bordello
 Eduardo Ciannelli as Parker Edward Ciannelli
 David Groh as Don Carbo
 Vittorio Duse as Mac Brown Victor Duncan 
 Nello Pazzafini as Policeman
 John McDouglas
 Helen Mirren

Music 
The film was scored by prolific score composer Piero Piccioni, who wrote the piece "Mexican Dream" as part of its soundtrack.

See also   
 List of Italian films of 1970

References

External links

1970 films
Italian crime films
1970 crime films
Films set in the United States
Films scored by Piero Piccioni
1970 directorial debut films
1970s English-language films
English-language Italian films
1970s Italian films